Rana Kanwar Pal Singh (born 16 October 1957) was an Indian politician from INC and a member of the Punjab Legislative Assembly. He was the Speaker of Punjab Legislative Assembly from  2017-2022.

Early life and education

Early life 
Singh was born in a Prominent Hindu Rajput Katoch family in Rupnagar. His family have vast lands in Punjab and had in Lyalpur of pre-partition Punjab.

Education 
After completing his primary education/schooling from Nurpur Bedi, District Ropar, he did his graduation from Government College, Ropar. Subsequently, he obtained the professional degree of LLB and started practice as an Advocate.

Political career 
A voracious reader by nature, he took a keen interest in agriculture apart from being a successful lawyer. He joined Indian National Congress through its youth organization Youth Congress in the year 1975 and since then he has been working continuously and untiringly for the people of Ropar district. He has contested assembly elections from Nangal and Anandpur Sahib constituency 4 times since 2002.

He was elected as MLA from Nangal Constituency and  Anandpur Sahib constituency in 2007. In 2002 he was appointed a Chairman, Punjab Pollution Control Board and Parliamentary Secretary (Industry & Commerce) in Punjab Government. He worked as a Chairman of various Assembly Committees. Apart from being associated with party organizations, he was also appointed Senator in Punjab University from the year 2002–07.

Electoral performance

Personal life

Family 
He married Rani Shashi Kanta a Bhati Rajput on 6 May 1981. He has two daughters (Married) and one son.

Other Works 
He is associated with various Congress party organizations and served the same as, Gen. Sec. Punjab Youth Cong., Gen. Sec. Punjab Pradesh Congress Committee, Spokesman Punjab Pradesh Congress Committee and Member of All India Congress Committee and Vice President of Punjab Pradesh Congress Committee. He is against putting Rajput Sikhs in Backward Class because of their glorious past and was also appointed Chief Patron of 'All India Rajput Student Union'.

References 

Punjab, India MLAs 2017–2022
1957 births
Indian National Congress politicians from Punjab, India
Living people